Zach Ness (born April 11, 1988) is a third-generation American motorcycle designer and entrepreneur. He is the grandson of motorcycle customizer Arlen Ness, and son of Cory Ness. In 2013 Zach teamed up with National Geographic Channel for the television series Let It Ride. The series followed Zach as he and the Ness crew built custom bikes for clients.

Notes

References

 
 

1988 births
Living people
Motorcycle builders
Motorcycle designers
American television personalities
Male television personalities